The second season of the animated television series Teen Titans, based on the DC comics series of the same time by Bob Haney and Bruno Premiani, originally aired on Cartoon Network in the United States. Developed by Glen Murakami, Sam Register, and television writer David Slack. The series was produced by DC Entertainment and Warner Bros. Animation. The series focuses on a team of crime-fighting teenaged superheroes, consisting of the leader Robin, foreign alien princess Starfire, green shapeshifter Beast Boy, the dark sorceress Raven, and the technological genius Cyborg. The season focuses on a new character, Terra, a hero possessing the ability to move the earth while struggling to accept her boundaries and the Titans as her friends, with Slade's looming presence in her life making it all the more difficult.

The season premiered on January 10, 2004 and ran until August 21, 2004, broadcasting 13 episodes. The season also aired on Kids' WB on later dates. The season re-aired on Kids' WB during the 2007–08 U.S. network television season on The CW for the final time, but instead airing episodes out of order.  

Warner Bros. Home Video released the second season on DVD in the United States on September 12, 2006 and in Canada on September 26, 2006. Upon release of the season on DVD, the season received critical acclaim with the Terra story arc being singled out for praise.

Production
Season two of Teen Titans aired on Cartoon Network Saturday nights at 9:00 P.M., from January 10 to August 21, 2004. During its broadcast, the series shifted from programming blocks Toonami to Miguzi, beginning April 17, 2004. The season was produced by DC Entertainment and Warner Bros. Animation, executive produced by Sander Schwartz and produced by Glen Murakami, Bruce Timm and Linda M. Steiner. Staff directors for the series included Michael Chang, Ciro Nieli and Alex Soto. The episodes for the season were written by a team of writers, which included Adam Beechen, Rick Copp, Rob Hoegee, Dwayne McDuffie, David Slack, and Amy Wolfram. Producer Murakami worked with Derrick Wyatt, Brianne Drouhard, and Jon Suzuki on character design while Hakjoon Kang was the background designer for the series.

Cast and characters

Scott Menville, Hynden Walch, Greg Cipes, Tara Strong, and Khary Payton - reprise their roles in the second season as their respective Teen Titans- Robin, Starfire, Beast Boy, Raven, and Cyborg. In addition to her role as Raven, Strong voices the character Kitten, the daughter of Killer Moth, in the episode "Date with Destiny." Season two also debuts Terra, a young teenage girl with the ability to move the earth around her, and who later develops a relationship with Beast Boy in her second stint with the team, with actress Ashley Johnson providing her voice. Ron Perlman reprises his role as the Titans' main villain Slade, in four episodes of the season. Dee Bradley Baker returns to the series, providing voices for several characters, including the Alien Dog and villain Soto in "Every Dog Has His Day"; Plasmus in two episodes; Overload in part one of the season finale; and Larry, Robin's double from another dimension, in the episode "Fractured." Wil Wheaton returns to his role of Aqualad in the episode "Winner Take All."

Season two of Teen Titans featured numerous guest actors providing voices for recurring and guest characters. In the episode "How Long is Forever?", Xander Berkeley plays the villain Warp. Keith David and actor and comedian John DiMaggio provided the voices of Atlas and Spike in "Only Human." In the episode "Fear Itself", veteran voice actress Tress MacNeille and actor Alexander Polinsky provide the voices of Horror Movie Actress and the villain Control Freak, respectively. Film actor Thomas Haden Church provided the voice of Killer Moth, a villain who breeds an insect army, in the episode "Date with Destiny." Will Friedle also voices the characters Fang and a frozen promgoer in the episode. The episode "Transformation" features narration by British actor Tony Jay the voice of Judge Claude Frollo in Disney's The Hunchback of Notre Dame (1996) 
and voice acting from Cathy Cavadini as the Cironielian chrysalis eater. In the episode "Winner Take All", Mike Erwin provided the voice of Speedy while Jim Cummings provided the voices of the Master of Games, the episode's main villain, and Wildebeest. Musician Henry Rollins voiced the character Johnny Rancid in the episode "Fractured".

Reception

The season received critical acclaim with the Terra story arc being singled out for praise. Writing for IGN, Filip Vuckevic gave the series an 8 out of 10, calling "is as fresh as it is fun." Vuckevic praised the season's visual, highlighting the episode "Fractured" as an example, and the story arc focused on Terra. John Sinnott of DVD Talk deemed the second season release as "Highly Recommended", writing that "These shows are just as entertaining as the first season episodes were. They are action filled, but the characters have real personalities. There is a good amount of humor and the occasional touching scene that works well." Sinnott highlighted episodes "How Long is Forever", "Fear Itself", and "Fractured" as his favorites while "Only Human" was his least favorite. Sinnott praised the episodes centered on Terra as "a pretty good adaptation of a great comic story." Mac McEntire of DVD Verdict praised the Terra story arc as "expertly played" and further commended the series' more dramatic moments, including the mud fight between Tara and Raven, "Beast Boy's late-night date with Terra and Robin's last-ditch effort to sway her to good." However, McEntire remained critical of the comedic aspect of the series, noting that the "two key elements of the series—the action and the comedy—were often at odds with each other." He also criticized the lack of back story for the main characters.

Episodes

DVD release

References

Teen Titans (TV series) seasons
2004 American television seasons